Lamar Township is a township in Barton County, Missouri, United States.  As of the 2000 census, its population was 1,569. The township completely surrounds, but does not include, the city of Lamar, Missouri.

Geography
According to the USGS, it contains four cemeteries: Fair View, Lake, Nigh and Saint Marys.

The streams of Dicks Fork, Elm Branch and Pettis Creek run through this township.

Transportation
Lamar Township contains one airport, Lamar Municipal Airport.

References
 USGS Geographic Names Information System (GNIS)

External links
 US-Counties.com
 City-Data.com

Townships in Barton County, Missouri
Townships in Missouri